The 1994 PBA season was the 20th season of the Philippine Basketball Association (PBA).

Season highlights
PBA Commissioner Rey Marquez steps down and Deputy Commissioner Jun Bernardino succeeded Marquez as the new PBA Commissioner.
The PBA has decided to send the All-Filipino Cup champions to the Hiroshima Asian Games in their continuing support to help the country in its quest to win the Asian basketball gold. 
The San Miguel Beermen earned the right to represent team Philippines by winning the All-Filipino championship over Coney Island. Amateur standouts Marlou Aquino, Kenneth Duremdes, Dennis Espino, Edward Feihl and Jeffrey Cariaso join the RP-San Miguel team. 
With injuries still hounding the San Miguel-RP Team in their preparation, Purefoods' stalwarts Alvin Patrimonio and Jerry Codiñera, who led the hotdogs to the Commissioner's Cup title, volunteered to play for the Philippine flag, the PBA change its original format in the Governor's Cup, as Purefoods Tender Juicy Hotdogs were seeded, along with San Miguel in the semifinal round, the league gave national coach Norman Black a free hand to pick one more player from Purefoods and he chooses rookie Rey Evangelista, the Alaska Milkmen also release Johnny Abarrientos to the national team with no conditions, three of the five amateur cagers practicing with the team, Dennis Espino, Edward Feihl and Jeffrey Cariaso were dropped from the roster.
The Philippine Team salvaged fourth place, losing their final game against Japan for the Bronze Medal.
Purefoods forward Alvin Patrimonio became the first back-to-back winner of the Most Valuable Player (MVP) award since William Adornado won it during the league's first two seasons. Patrimonio won his third MVP trophy, tying Bogs Adornado' three MVP awards.

Opening ceremonies
The muses for the participating teams are as follows:

Champions
 All-Filipino Cup: San Miguel Beermen
 Commissioner's Cup: Purefoods TJ Hotdogs 
 Governors Cup: Alaska Milkmen
 Team with best win–loss percentage: Alaska Milkmen (45–28, .616)
 Best Team of the Year: Purefoods TJ Hotdogs (2nd)

All-Filipino Cup

Elimination round

Semifinal round

Third place playoffs 

|}

Finals

|}
Best Player of the Conference: Jerry Codiñera (Coney Island)

Commissioner's Cup

Elimination round

Semifinal round

Third place playoffs 

 San Miguel Beermen forfeited the third place playoffs in favor of the Swift Mighty Meaties.

Finals

|}
Best Player of the Conference: Alvin Patrimonio (Purefoods)
Best Import of the Conference: Ken Redfield (Purefoods)

Governors' Cup

Elimination round

Semifinal round

Third place playoffs 

|}

Finals

|}
Best Player of the Conference: Vergel Meneses (Sunkist)
Best Import of the Conference: Ronnie Coleman (Pepsi)

Awards
 Most Valuable Player: Alvin Patrimonio (Purefoods)
 Rookie of the Year:  Boybits Victoria (Swift)
 Sportsmanship Award: Jerry Codiñera (Purefoods)
 Most Improved Player: Bong Hawkins (Alaska)
 Defensive Player of the Year: Jerry Codiñera (Purefoods)
 Mythical Five: 
Johnny Abarrientos (Alaska) 
Ato Agustin (San Miguel) 
Jerry Codiñera (Purefoods) 
Alvin Patrimonio (Purefoods) 
Vergel Meneses (Swift)
 Mythical Second Team: 
Boybits Victoria (Sunkist) 
Allan Caidic (San Miguel)
Benjie Paras (Shell)
Bong Hawkins (Alaska)
Nelson Asaytono (Swift)
 All Defensive Team: 
Jerry Codiñera (Purefoods)
Glenn Capacio (Purefoods)
Johnny Abarrientos (Alaska)
Alvin Teng (San Miguel) 
Bong Hawkins (Alaska)

Awards given by the PBA Press Corps
 Coach of the Year: Tim Cone (Alaska)
 Mr. Quality Minutes: Merwin Castelo (Alaska)
 Executive of the Year: Elmer Yanga (Swift)
 Special Award (Outstanding Freshman Season): Rey Evangelista
 Referee of the Year: Ernesto de Leon

Board of Governors
 Jun Bernardino (Commissioner)
 Ruben Cleofe (Secretary)
 Wilfred Steven Uytengsu (Chairman, General Milling Corp.)
 Jose Concepcion III (Vice-Chairman, Republic Flour Mills Corp.)
 Nazario Avendaño (Treasurer, San Miguel Corp.)
 Renato Buhain (Purefoods Corp.)
 Edgardo Viron Cruz (Pilipinas Shell Petroleum Corp.)
 Vicente Santos (Sta. Lucia Realty and Development, Inc)
 Moro Lorenzo (Pepsi Cola Products Philippines, Inc)
 Bernabe Navarro (La Tondeña Distillers, Inc)

Cumulative standings

References

 
PBA